A castle with crenellated walls and towers. Built for the medieval emperor and King of Sicily Frederick II, Holy Roman Emperor, it was built in Prato, Italy on top of a previous fortification of which two towers remain.

When Frederick II died building was stopped and the interior was never finished. The castle is open to the public and although some destruction took place during the fascist regime, reconstruction work has begun and is ongoing. It is possible to climb the stairs up to the top of the castle walls and walkways for a bird's eye view over the surrounding city of Prato.

It was built between 1237 and 1247 by Riccardo da Lentini.

Gallery

References

External links

Castello dell'Imperatore
English language website about Castello Dell'Imperatore

Imperatore
Buildings and structures in Prato
Medieval Italian architecture
Buildings and structures completed in 1247
Buildings and structures completed in the 13th century
Tourist attractions in Tuscany
Frederick II, Holy Roman Emperor